Tithoniidae is an extinct family of sea urchins.

References
 Thuy B, Gale AS, Kroh A, Kucera M, Numberger-Thuy LD, Reich M, et al. (2012) Ancient Origin of the Modern Deep-Sea Fauna. PLoS ONE 7(10): e46913. doi:10.1371/journal.pone.0046913

Prehistoric echinoderm families